Léonard Dhejju (14 March 1931 – 4 June 2019) was a Congolese Roman Catholic bishop.

Dhejju was born in the Democratic Republic of the Congo and was ordained to the priesthood in 1959. He served as bishop of the Roman Catholic Diocese of Uvira from 1981 to 1984. Dhejju then served as bishop of the Roman Catholic Diocese of Bunia from 1984 to 2002.

Notes

1931 births
2019 deaths
21st-century Roman Catholic bishops in the Democratic Republic of the Congo
20th-century Roman Catholic bishops in the Democratic Republic of the Congo
Roman Catholic bishops of Uvira
Roman Catholic bishops of Bunia
21st-century Democratic Republic of the Congo people